The Shire of Tara was a local government area in the Darling Downs region of Queensland, Australia.

Important industries  in the area include wheat, beef and wool.  In recent years there have been large scale rural subdivisions developed in the area. Prickly pear infestation in the early 1900s had a devastating effect on the area that was only alleviated by the introduction of the cactoblastis moth.

Attractions in Tara include Southwood National Park, a remnant area of the southern brigalow belt.

History
The Shire of Tara was established on 12 January 1912 by severance from the Shire of Wambo.

On 15 March 2008, under the Local Government (Reform Implementation) Act 2007 passed by the Parliament of Queensland on 10 August 2007, the Shire of Tara merged with the Town of Dalby and the Shires of Chinchilla, Murilla and Wambo and the southern part of Taroom to form the Western Downs Region.

Towns and localities
The Shire of Tara included the following settlements:

Towns:
 Tara
 Glenmorgan
 Moonie
 The Gums

Localities:
 Flinton
 Goranba
 Meandarra
 Weranga
 Westmar

Chairmen
 1927: Andrew Watt Adams

Population

References

Former local government areas of Queensland
Darling Downs
2008 disestablishments in Australia
Populated places disestablished in 2008